Thomas Bowser was an American sports executive, who owned the Indianapolis ABCs of Negro league baseball. He owned the team, along with C. I. Taylor, in 1914 and 1915. In 1916, Taylor and Bowser split apart, and formed two separate ABCs teams. Bowser's ABCs fell apart soon after.

References

External links
Indianapolis ABCs story on MLB.com

Year of birth missing
Year of death missing
Baseball executives
Negro league baseball executives